Jeff Terrell may refer to:

 Jeff Terrell, Berlin Raceway 1995 Randy Sweet Late Model Champion (Sportsman Champion) and 1999 Randy Sweet Late Model Champion (Super Stock Champion)
 Jeff Terrell, fictional character Shaft (Image Comics)

See also

 Terrell (disambiguation)
 Jeff (disambiguation)